The Konjic Mithraeum, or Konjički Mithraeum, is a Mithraeum, a temple dedicated to God of the Sun, Mithra, discovered in Konjic, Bosnia and Herzegovina. Temple is declared National Monument of Bosnia and Herzegovina.

History
The mithraeum in Konjic was a temple dedicated to God of the Sun, Mithra. The god was worshiped and cult of Mithraism spread to other parts of Roman Empire, throughout the Mediterranean basin, by slaves and merchants from the Orient, and by Roman soldiers who came into contact with the followers of the cult in the East.

Discovery and protection
The remains of the Mithraeum in Konjic were discovered January 1897. The Konjic site is atypical as its floor level is at ground level. This means that temple main characteristic is absence of cave, hollow ground or even constructed spelaea. The Mithraism followers sought as a norm to found their places of worship in caves, whereas in absence of such topographical features they would excavate the soil, where the terrain permitted, and built small single-celled temple, known as spelaea, to reinforce the impression of a cave. However, in case of Konjic, temple was established on open ground, and only protection and seclusion was provided by dense forest, which disappeared by times of its discovery.

Temple is declared National Monument of Bosnia and Herzegovina.

See also
 List of National Monuments of Bosnia and Herzegovina
 Jajce Mithraeum

References

m
m
m
m
m
m
Mithraea
Mithraism in Bosnia and Herzegovina in the Roman era
4th-century religious buildings and structures